Jarrett 1973 is an NBC TV film, starring Glenn Ford and directed by Barry Shear.

Plot
A private investigator specializing; Glenn Ford in fine arts tries to track down some missing rare biblical scrolls.

Cast 
Glenn Ford as Sam Jarrett  
Anthony Quayle as Cosmo Bastrop  
Forrest Tucker as Rev. Simpson  
Richard Anderson as Spencer Loomis 
Yvonne Craig as Luluwa
Elliott Montgomery as Dr. Carey  
Laraine Stephens as Sigrid Larsen  
Jody Gilbert as Sawyer

See also
 List of American films of 1973

References
A history of underground comics by Mark James Estren.
Movies made for television: the telefeature and the mini-series, 1964-1986 by Alvin H. Marill

External links 
 

American television films
Films directed by Barry Shear
1970s English-language films